Andrea Botez (born April 6, 2002) is a Canadian-American chess player, commentator, Twitch streamer and YouTuber from Vancouver, British Columbia, Canada.

Background 
On the BotezLive Twitch channel, Botez's father, Andrei Botez, known as "Papa Botez" by the community, told the story of moving to Canada. He and his wife moved from the Socialist Republic of Romania to Canada, before Alexandra, Andrea's older sister, was born in Dallas. The Botez family relocated to Texas, where both sisters completed their schooling. Their father introduced Alexandra and Andrea to chess at the age of six and he started training them. At the beginning of her chess training, Andrea tagged along with her dad and her sister, who was already competing in major tournaments such as the World Youth Chess Championship, which motivated Andrea to start taking chess seriously.

Career

Chess 
Botez began playing chess at the age of six, following her sister's background. She started playing in the USChess tournaments at the age of seven. In 2010, she won the U8 Girls Canadian Youth Chess Championship
In 2015, at the age of thirteen she became the Women British Columbia Chess Champion. In the same year, Botez also won the Susan Polgar National Open.
 
In 2016, at the SPFNO 2016: U14 GIRLS, Botez placed fourth in the tournament, and 13th in the 2016 Susan Polgar Foundation Girls' Invitational.

Botez attained her highest FIDE classical rating of 1773 in 2018 and her highest USChess rating of 1933 in 2019. As of December 2022, her ranking among active players in the world is 67,989, based on her rating.

In December 2022, Botez competed against WGM (Woman Grandmaster) Dina Belenkaya in the Mogul Chessboxing Championship; hosted by Ludwig Ahgren. The fight consisted of 7 rounds alternating of chess and boxing, until a player/fighter got a TKO or was checkmated. As Belenkaya could checkmate in one move, Botez was successful in stalling to run down time for a final round of boxing to get a TKO. During the final round of boxing, Belenkaya seemed to escape a TKO and go back to chess. With only 6 seconds remaining, Botez resigned instead of allowing checkmate and Belenkaya was announced the winner. The win became controversial, as viewers noticed that Botez had actually received a TKO that was not noticed by officials, and the referee for the match was criticised for the way the TKO was managed. The organizer's Twitter account "Mogul Moves" announced an updated result after a review of the fight "...[Botez] should have been awarded a TKO after the referee initiated the fourth standing count of the fight". The update resulted in both Belenkaya and Botez being winners. Botez's sister criticised the ref immediately after the match, while Botez criticised the ref on her Twitch stream and recalled that the ref apologised to her for the TKO mistake. Botez later put herself forward in consideration for the next Creator Clash, a charity boxing event hosted by iDubbbz, while Belenkaya suggested a rematch.

Content creation 
Alongside her sister, Botez runs the Twitch channel BotezLive, which, as of May 2022, has 1.1 million followers with more than 18.3 million views. She began assisting her sister in 2020 by playing chess and in other variety streams and the YouTube channel BotezLive which, as of May 2022, has over 800k subscribers and 140 million views.

Because of their popularity on various content platforms, the Botez sisters became some of the most known figures on the Chess.com platform, alongside GM Hikaru Nakamura and WGM Qiyu Zhou.

On December 21, 2020, Andrea and Alexandra signed a contract with Envy Gaming as content creators at the launch of the organization's creator network and ambassador program.. They would later move to Los Angeles, CA, where they would join other content creators such as JustaMinx and CodeMiko in the Envy Content House

On her personal TikTok account where she posts highlights from her twitch streams, TikTok trends and short videos from her daily life, Botez has garnered over 310K followers and 5.9M likes.

Travel show 
When Andrea and Alexandra do not stream from their regular set-up at home playing chess or doing various activities, the two sisters host a show on their Twitch channel called "Botez Abroad"  where they travel to big cities from around the world and they stream their in-person matches in front of a live audience.

PogChamps 
In the second iteration of the online amateur chess tournament Pogchamps, Botez was part of the commentator team.
In 2021, Botez took part again in the Pogchamps 3 tournament, doubling as a coach for CodeMiko and as a commentator, and, once again, she joined the commentator team for Pogchamps 4.

Charity 
In 2020, Botez participated in the Zoomers Play Chess team match to help raise funds for children in need affected by the COVID-19 pandemic.

Boxing record

Awards and nominations

References

External links

American female chess players
Canadian female chess players
Canadian people of Romanian descent
Twitch (service) streamers
2002 births
Living people